Tangalle National Boys' School was established in 1879 and is the oldest Christian missionary school in the Hambantota District.
The school, which opened on 31 October 1879, was originally called Christ Church College. The first principal and administrator of the college was Rev. Father C. A. W. Jayasekara.  Initially it was a boys college but later became a mixed school. In 1962 the school was taken over by the government and the name was changed to Tangalle Maha Vidyalaya. In 1994 it was renamed to Tangalle National Boys' School. The current principal is N. G. Gaminidasa.

References

1879 establishments in Ceylon
Boys' schools in Sri Lanka
Educational institutions established in 1879
National schools in Sri Lanka
Provincial schools in Sri Lanka
Schools in Hambantota District
Buildings and structures in Tangalle